Acacia aulacophylla is a shrub of the genus Acacia and the subgenus Plurinerves that is endemic to western Australia.

Description
Like most species of Acacia it has phyllodes rather than true leaves. It blooms from April to August and produces yellow flowers and produces simple inflorescences simple that appear singly or in pairs in the axils. The spherical flower-heads have a diameter of  containing 40 to 87 densely packed golden coloured flowers. Following flowering leathery and glabrous seed pods form that have a linear shape and are not strongly raised over or constricted between each of the seeds.

Taxonomy
The species was first formally described by the botanists Richard Sumner Cowan and Bruce Maslin in 1995 as part of the work Acacia Miscellany. Five groups of microneurous species of Acacia (Leguminosae: Mimosoideae: section Plurinerves), mostly from Western Australia as published in the journal Nuytsia. It was later reclassified as Racosperma aulacophyllum by Leslie Pedley in 2003 and then transferred back to genus Acacia in 2006.

Distribution
It is native to an area in the Wheatbelt, Mid West and Goldfields-Esperance regions of Western Australia where it is commonly situated on plains, breakaways and laterite or granite hills growing in clay, loamy, sandy or rocky soils. It has a scattered distribution with the bulk of the population found from around Byro Station in the north to around Morawa in the south to around Cue in the east as a part of scrubland communities dominated by other species of Acacia.

See also
 List of Acacia species

References

External links
 

aulacophylla
Acacias of Western Australia
Plants described in 1995
Taxa named by Bruce Maslin
Taxa named by Richard Sumner Cowan